Sir Henry Staveley Lawrence  (20 October 1870 – 29 June 1949) was a British civil servant and colonial administrator. He was the Acting governor of Bombay during the British Raj from 20 March 1926 to 8 December 1928.

Born in County Donegal, he was the son of George Henry Lawrence, a judge in the British Civil Service, and Margaret Staveley. He was the grandson of Sir George St Patrick Lawrence  of the British Indian Army and great-nephew of Sir 
Henry Montgomery Lawrence and John Lawrence, 1st Baron Lawrence. 

He was appointed a Knight Commander of the Order of the Star of India in the 1926 New Year Honours.

References

Governors of Bombay
1870 births
1949 deaths
Knights Commander of the Order of the Star of India
People from County Donegal
Indian Civil Service (British India) officers
Recipients of the Kaisar-i-Hind Medal